Apuleius (also called Lucius Apuleius Madaurensis; c. 124 – after  170) was a Numidian Latin-language prose writer, Platonist philosopher and rhetorician. He lived in the Roman province of Numidia, in the Berber city of Madauros, modern-day M'Daourouch, Algeria. He studied Platonism in Athens, travelled to Italy, Asia Minor, and Egypt, and was an initiate in several cults or mysteries. The most famous incident in his life was when he was accused of using magic to gain the attentions (and fortune) of a wealthy widow. He declaimed and then distributed his own defense before the proconsul and a court of magistrates convened in Sabratha, near ancient Tripoli, Libya. This is known as the Apologia.

His most famous work is his bawdy picaresque novel the Metamorphoses, otherwise known as The Golden Ass. It is the only Latin novel that has survived in its entirety. It relates the adventures of its protagonist, Lucius, who experiments with magic and is accidentally turned into a donkey. Lucius goes through various adventures before he is turned back into a human being by the goddess Isis.

Life 

Apuleius was born in Madauros, a colonia in Numidia on the North African coast bordering Gaetulia, and he described himself as "half-Numidian half-Gaetulian." Madaurus was the same colonia where Augustine of Hippo later received part of his early education, and, though located well away from the Romanized coast, is today the site of some pristine Roman ruins. As to his first name, no praenomen is given in any ancient source; late-medieval manuscripts began the tradition of calling him Lucius from the name of the hero of his novel. Details regarding his life come mostly from his defense speech (Apology) and his work Florida, which consists of snippets taken from some of his best speeches.

His father was a provincial magistrate (duumvir) who bequeathed at his death the sum of nearly two million sesterces to his two sons. Apuleius studied with a master at Carthage (where he later settled) and later at Athens, where he studied Platonist philosophy among other subjects. He subsequently went to Rome to study Latin rhetoric and, most likely, to speak in the law courts for a time before returning to his native North Africa. He also travelled extensively in Asia Minor and Egypt, studying philosophy and religion, burning up his inheritance while doing so.

Apuleius was an initiate in several Greco-Roman mysteries, including the Dionysian Mysteries. He was a priest of Asclepius and, according to Augustine, sacerdos provinciae Africae (i.e., priest of the province of Carthage).

Not long after his return home he set out upon a new journey to Alexandria. On his way there he was taken ill at the town of Oea (modern-day Tripoli) and was hospitably received into the house of Sicinius Pontianus, with whom he had been friends when he had studied in Athens. The mother of Pontianus, Pudentilla, was a very rich widow. With her son's consent – indeed encouragement – Apuleius agreed to marry her. Meanwhile, Pontianus himself married the daughter of one Herennius Rufinus; he, indignant that Pudentilla's wealth should pass out of the family, instigated his son-in-law, together with a younger brother, Sicinius Pudens, a mere boy, and their paternal uncle, Sicinius Aemilianus, to join him in impeaching Apuleius upon the charge that he had gained the affections of Pudentilla by charms and magic spells. The case was heard at Sabratha, near Tripoli, c. 158 AD, before Claudius Maximus, proconsul of Africa. The accusation itself seems to have been ridiculous, and the spirited and triumphant defence spoken by Apuleius is still extant. This is known as the Apologia (A Discourse on Magic).

Apuleius accused an extravagant personal enemy of turning his house into a brothel and prostituting his own wife.

Of his subsequent career, we know little. Judging from the many works of which he was author, he must have devoted himself diligently to literature. He occasionally gave speeches in public to great reception; he had the charge of exhibiting gladiatorial shows and wild beast events in the province, and statues were erected in his honour by the senate of Carthage and of other senates.

The date, place and circumstances of Apuleius' death are not known. There is no record of his activities after 170, a fact which has led some people to believe that he must have died about then (say in 171), although other scholars feel that he may still have been alive in 180 or even 190.

Works

The Golden Ass 

The Golden Ass (Asinus Aureus) or Metamorphoses is the only Latin novel that has survived in its entirety. It is an imaginative, irreverent, and amusing work that relates the ludicrous adventures of one Lucius, who introduces himself as related to the famous philosophers Plutarch and Sextus of Chaeronea. Lucius experiments with magic and is accidentally turned into an ass. In this guise, he hears and sees many unusual things, until escaping from his predicament in a rather unexpected way. Within this frame story are found many digressions, the longest among them being the well-known tale of Cupid and Psyche. This story is a rare instance of a fairy tale preserved in an ancient literary text.

The Metamorphoses ends with the (once again human) hero, Lucius, eager to be initiated into the mystery cult of Isis; he abstains from forbidden foods, bathes, and purifies himself. He is introduced to the Navigium Isidis. Then the secrets of the cult's books are explained to him, and further secrets are revealed before he goes through the process of initiation, which involves a trial by the elements on a journey to the underworld. Lucius is then asked to seek initiation into the cult of Osiris in Rome, and eventually is initiated into the pastophoroi – a group of priests that serves Isis and Osiris.

The Apologia 
Apologia (Apulei Platonici pro Se de Magia) is the version of the defence presented in Sabratha, in 158–159, before the proconsul Claudius Maximus, by Apuleius accused of the crime of magic. Between the traditional exordium and peroratio, the argumentation is divided into three sections:
 Refutation of the accusations levelled against his private life. He demonstrates that by marrying Pudentilla he had no interested motive and that he carries it away, intellectually and morally, on his opponents.
 Attempt to prove that his so-called "magical operations" were in fact indispensable scientific experiments for an imitator of Aristotle and Hippocrates, or the religious acts of a Roman Platonist.
 A recount of the events that have occurred in Oea since his arrival and pulverize the arguments against him.
The main interest of the Apology is historical, as it offers substantial information about its author, magic and life in Africa in the second century.

Other works 
His other works are:
 Florida. A compilation of twenty-three extracts from his various speeches and lectures.
 De Platone et dogmate eius (On Plato and his Doctrine). An outline in two books of Plato's physics and ethics, preceded by a life of Plato
  (On the God of Socrates). A work on the existence and nature of daemons, the intermediaries between gods and humans. This treatise was attacked by Augustine of Hippo. It contains a passage comparing gods and kings which is the first recorded occurrence of the proverb "familiarity breeds contempt":
 On the Universe. This Latin translation of Pseudo-Aristotle's work De Mundo is probably by Apuleius.

Apuleius wrote many other works which have not survived. He wrote works of poetry and fiction, as well as technical treatises on politics, dendrology, agriculture, medicine, natural history, astronomy, music, and arithmetic, and he translated Plato's Phaedo.

Spurious works 
The extant works wrongly attributed to Apuleius are:
 Peri Hermeneias (On interpretation). A brief Latin version of a guide to Aristotelian logic.
 Asclepius. A Latin paraphrase of a lost Greek dialogue (The perfect discourse) featuring Asclepius and Hermes Trismegistus.

Apuleian Sphere 
The Apuleian Sphere described in Petosiris to Nechepso, also known as "Columcille's Circle" or "Petosiris' Circle", is a magical prognosticating device for predicting the survival of a patient.

See also
 Boethius
 Square of opposition

Notes

Citations

References

External links 

 
 
 
 Works by Apuleius at Perseus Digital Library
 
 
 L. Apuleii Opera Omnia, Lipsia, sumtibus C. Cnoblochii, 1842, pars I (the Metamorphoses) and pars II (Florida, De Deo Socratis, De Dogmate Platonis, De Mundo Libri, Asclepius, Apologia et Fragmenta), in a critical edition with explanatory notes
 The works of Apuleius, London, George Bell and sons, 1878 (English translation)
 Apuleius (123–180 CE) the Famous Berber writer
 Apulei Opera (Latin texts of all the surviving works of Apuleius) at The Latin Library
 English translation of Florida by H. E. Butler
 English translation of the Apologia by H. E. Butler
 English translation of the God of Socrates by Thomas Taylor
 Apuleius – Apologia: Seminar (Latin text of the Apologia with H. E. Butler's English translation and an English crib with discussion and commentary)
 Apology as Prosecution: The Trial of Apuleius
 Apuleius' works: text, concordances and frequency list
 Ongoing website for "Apuleius and Africa" conference
 Apuleius and Africa Bibliography
 The Spectacles of Apuleius: a digital humanities project
 Free public domain audiobook version of ''Apuleius on the Doctrines of Plato translated by George Burges

2nd-century Berber people
124 births
170 deaths
2nd-century clergy
2nd-century novelists
2nd-century philosophers
2nd-century Romans
2nd-century Latin writers
Ancient Roman rhetoricians
Appuleii
Berber writers
Classical Latin novelists
Magic (supernatural)
Middle Platonists
People from Souk Ahras Province
Priests of the Roman Empire
Romans from Africa
Silver Age Latin writers